Mohammad Farid Ahmadi is an Afghan army officer who was Commander of the Afghan National Army Special Operations Corps from May 2019 to January 2021.

Ahmadi joined the Afghan Army in April 1991. He attended the United States Army Command and General Staff College and King's College London.

References

Year of birth missing (living people)
Living people
Alumni of King's College London
Afghan military personnel
Afghan military officers
Non-U.S. alumni of the Command and General Staff College